The 1st Central Committee of the Workers' Party of North Korea (WPNK) was elected by the 1st Congress on 30 August 1946 through the merger of the Communist Party of North Korea and the New People's Party of Korea, and remained in session until the election of the 2nd Central Committee on 30 March 1948. In between party congresses and specially convened conferences the Central Committee is the highest decision-making institution in the party and North Korea. The 1st Central Committee was not a permanent institution and delegated day-to-day work to elected central guidance bodies, such as the Political Committee, the Standing Committee and the Organisation Committee (membership not disclosed). It convened meetings, known as Plenary Sessions of the 1st Central Committee, to discuss major policies. A plenary session could be attended by non-members. These meetings are known as Enlarged Plenary Sessions. The party rules approved at the 1st Congress stipulated that the Central Committee needed to convene for a plenary session every third month. In total, the 1st Central Committee convened for twelve plenary sessions, of which eight were convened in 1947.

Forty-three members were elected to the 1st Central Committee, of which thirty-one were re-elected at the 2nd Congress. Its members convened for the 1st Plenary Session on 31 August 1946 and elected the 1st Organisation Committee, 1st Standing Committee and the 1st Political Committee, and voted in Kim Tu-bong as the WPNK Chairman and Kim Il-sung and Chu Yong-ha were elected vice chairmen. Despite their formal roles, real powers remained in Kim Il-sung's hands, and Kim Tu-bong played a more ceremonial role due to his unwillingness to partake in the day-to-day management of party affairs. In the 1st Plenary Session's aftermath, the party began establishing state structures known as provisional people's committees throughout the country, and in 1947 national elections to the People's Assembly was organised. At its first plenary session, the assembly elected a Presidium and designated Kim Tu-bong as its chairman and appointed the People's Committee (the government) and elected Kim Il-sung as its chairman. Of twenty-two government members, sixteen were members of the WPNK.

A feature of early North Korean politics was its factionalism. Four loosely defined factions had taken shape by this time; Kim Il-sung's partisans, domestic communists, the Yanan group and the Soviet Koreans. The partisans, comprising soldiers who had fought Japanese rule with Kim Il-sung, lacked both theoretical and organisational experience to take leading party offices. They were therefore poorly represented in the 1st Central Committee. The domestic faction, composed of indigenous communists and leading members of the Workers' Party of South Korea, were underrepresented due to their underground activities in South Korea. Korean revolutionaries based in China during Japanese rule, known as the Yanan faction, had the most representation on the committee. The Soviet Koreans, composed of Koreans who were either Soviet-born or lived there during Japanese rule, also had significant representation. The conflict between these factions would intensify over the years, with Soviet Korean Yu Song-gol stating that he "as early as 1947... overheard how former partisans not only mentioned the [Yanans] and 'Soviets' with a great deal of animosity but also expressed the desire to be rid of them in due course." These factional conflicts were rarely based on policy differences but rather on personal interests and the struggle for power. Scholar Andrey Lankov notes that "at least [twenty-eight] members" of the 1st Central Committee "became victims of Kim Il-sung's purges. The real number was probably even higher since, in many cases, purges were not made public."

A conflict between Kim Il-sung's partisan faction and Pak Hon-yong's domestic faction had been brewing since the North Korean Branch Bureau's formation in October 1945. The leading domestic communist in the North, O Ki-sop, was accused of making "leftist and rightist errors" at the 3rd Enlarged Plenary Session. Vice Chairman Chu Yong-ha further elaborated on the criticism and claimed that "O had attempted to apply labour union principles under capitalism to the socialist setting of North Korea, thereby deliberately inciting unthinking workers." O Ki-sop defended himself by citing the works of Vladimir Lenin and claimed that "[if I am such] a pain in the neck then why not just pin the label of Trotskyite on [me]?" While Pak Il-u supposedly rose in his defence and called for a committee to study the Lenin work in question, Kim Il-sung stated that no such committee was necessary due to O Ki-sop's past mistakes. The criticism of O Ki-sop and the attacks on the indigenous North Korean communist movement that had remained active in Korea during Japanese colonialism were supported by the partisans, Soviet Koreans and the Yanans.

Plenary sessions

Members

Notes

References

Citations

Bibliography
Books:
 
 
 

Dissertations:
 

Journals:
 

1st Central Committee of the Workers' Party of North Korea
1946 in North Korea
1946 establishments in North Korea
1948 disestablishments in North Korea